Lake Del Valle is a storage reservoir located  southeast of Livermore, in Alameda County, California. It is within Del Valle Regional Park.

Lake description

It is on Arroyo Valle (Spanish for "creek of the valley") in the Diablo Range.  The lake is formed by Del Valle Dam, completed in 1968.

The lake and dam are part of the California State Water Project, as part of the South Bay Aqueduct. The lake serves in part as off-stream storage for the South Bay Aqueduct. Thus normally stores . The lake is a popular destination for hikers, bikers, and boaters.
 
The Hetch Hetchy Aqueduct passes below the lake, but does not connect to it.

The California Office of Environmental Health Hazard Assessment issued a fishing advisory regarding the mercury levels of fish caught from the body of water.

Dam description
The dam contains  of earth fill.

See also
 List of dams and reservoirs in California
 List of lakes in California
 List of lakes in the San Francisco Bay Area

References

External links 
 Lake Del Valle recreation information, California Department of Water Resources
 Lake Del Valle data at California Data Exchange Center
 

Del Valle
California State Water Project
Dams in California
California Department of Water Resources dams
Diablo Range
East Bay Regional Park District
Del Valle
Infrastructure completed in 1968